Francis Worley  (December 23, 1913 – May 8, 2003) was a Republican member of the Pennsylvania House of Representatives.

References

Republican Party members of the Pennsylvania House of Representatives
1913 births
2003 deaths
20th-century American politicians